Radio is a 2009 Indian comedy-drama film starring Himesh Reshammiya, Shenaz Treasurywala and Sonal Sehgal in the lead roles. The film is directed by Isshaan Trivedi. The movie was released on 4 December 2009. Reshammiya has received praise for his portrayal of Vivan Shah.

Plot 
Vivan is a successful RJ on a popular radio channel in the city of Mumbai. He has acquired everything in life but his marriage is unsuccessful. He is going through a divorce even though he does not want it because his wife thinks they are incompatible and she is unhappy. In their hearts Vivan and Pooja don't want the divorce but the fast pace of life and busy schedules interfere with her emotional balance.

Enters Shanaya, who is like a ray of sunshine in Vivan's insipid life. Initially he is reluctant to get close with Shanaya but slowly finds himself happy to be around her. However we see that his Ex-Pooja wants vivan back in her life. When she lets him know that she wants him back he interrupts her and let her know that he wants to be with Shanaya. Pooja can also sense his love for Shanaya. She becomes the catalyst in his realization that he in facts love Shanaya. Vivan also tries to get close to Shanaya's family. Although Pooja still has a soft spot for Vivan and cares for him she realises that he wants to spend his life with Shanaya.

Who will be eventually reign on his heart? Will he take the step to make his vows with Shanaya?

Cast

Box Office reception 
The film released on 4 December 2009.

Critical reception 
Though the film was panned by many critics, Himesh Reshammiya got good reviews for his acting.

Taran Adarsh wrote," Himesh Reshammiya has grown as an actor that reflects in certain difficult moments of the film."

Nikhat Kazmi of Times of India wrote, "Himesh Reshammiya tries to reinvent himself. Himesh Reshammiya as RJ Vivan Shah, does seem to have found a better groove. In fact, this new clean, casual avatar of his does seem to work".

Music 
All music composed by Himesh Reshammiya with lyrics by Subrat Sinha.
The music of the film opened to positive reviews, with Bollywoodhungama.com giving it 4 stars out of 5. The album features couple of songs performed by musicians like Kailash Kher, Rekha Bhardwaj.

Track list

Three remixes are also included in the album. 3 songs were remixed by Dj Akbar Sami
 
 Mann Ka Radio – Himesh Reshammiya
 Zindagi Jaise Ek Radio – Himesh Reshammiya
 Piya Jaise Ladoo Motichur Wale – Himesh Reshammiya and Rekha Bhardwaj

References

External links
 

2000s Hindi-language films
2009 films
Films scored by Himesh Reshammiya
Films about radio
T-Series (company) films